Seocho Station is a station on the Seoul Subway Line 2. It is located in Seocho-dong, Seocho-gu, Seoul.

Station layout

Ridership

Neighborhoods
Exit 1: Korea Research Institute for Local Administration
Exit 5: Supreme Public Prosecutor's Office
Exit 5: National Library of Korea
Exit 5: Supreme Court of Korea
Exit 5: Seocho Police Station
Exit 6: Seoul Central Public Prosecutor's Office

References

Seoul Metropolitan Subway stations
Railway stations opened in 1983
Metro stations in Seocho District
1983 establishments in South Korea
20th-century architecture in South Korea